The following is a list of Weber State Wildcats football seasons.

Seasons

References

Weber State

Weber State Wildcats football seasons